ED4 (Electric train Demikhovskiy 4-th modification) is a series of Russian electric trainsets, in production since 1996. The trains are produced by DMZ and currently in service on RZD lines in almost every part of the country and former USSR states.

Production history

The ED4 was designed to accommodate Russia's need for a domestically produced electric train-set. Russia's most widely exploited electric trains, the ER1 and ER2 series, were produced by the Rīgas Vagonbūves Rūpnīca (RVR) plant in Latvia before the collapse of the USSR.

Design work began in 1996 on the basis of the earlier ED2 series, which were largely equipped with RVR components. Electronic equipment for the new train was manufactured by The Novocherkassk Electric Locomotive Plant, while the drive-train was built in Novosibirsk. ED4 train-cars are nearly identical to those used by both the ER29, and ED2T trains, differing mainly in having notably wider doors. 

After successfully completing testing, the first train entered service at the Mineralnye Vody Depot of the North Caucasus Railway. 

Only 5 trains carry the early ED4 identification, as the second variant, ED4M, began exclusive production thereafter. The main difference between the two trains is the equipment and shape of the operator's compartment.

Four of the early ED4 trains are in currently in service on the Moscow Railway, one on the North Caucasian Railway, and one in Belgorod.

Variants and modifications

ED4M

ED4M1

ED4MK

ED4MKu

ED4MKM

ED4MKM-AERO
Mechanically almost identical to the ED4MKM, these trains have an updated interior, modified for the needs of airport commuters. The AERO trains are in service in Moscow and St.Petersburg, serving the Domodedovo, Vnukovo, Sheremtyevo and Pulkovo airports, respectively. The modified door mechanisms of the AERO were used on all later ED4M trains.

ED4E

See also

 The Museum of the Moscow Railway, at Paveletsky Rail Terminal, Moscow
 Rizhsky Rail Terminal, Home of the Moscow Railway Museum
 Varshavsky Rail Terminal, St.Petersburg, Home of the Central Museum of Railway Transport, Russian Federation
 History of rail transport in Russia

References

External links
 ЭД4М на сайте Демиховского машиностроительного завода – Website of the Demikhovo Machine-building plant (Russian)
 История электропоездов серии ЭД4 (Russian)
 Презентация первого частного электропоезда повышенной комфортности ЭД4МКу-0151 (Russian)
 RZD ED4M @ Trainspo
 AEX ED4MKM-Aero @ Trainspo

Electric multiple units of Russia
Electric multiple units of Ukraine
Train-related introductions in 1997
3000 V DC multiple units